Pablo Sanz Iniesta (born 30 August 1973) is a Spanish former footballer who played as a midfielder, and the current assistant manager of Premier League club Wolverhampton Wanderers.

Playing career
Pablo Sanz was a Barcelona youth product and started his playing career at Barcelona B as midfielder. Due to a lack of playing time, he left for Gimnàstic after just one season. However, he returned to Barcelona B after another season, playing 56 matches and scoring one goal. After Barcelona, he joined Rayo Vallecano  in 1997, playing for seven seasons before leaving in 2004, spending the majority of his career with them. He played 168 matches and scored 10 goals. 

In 2004, he joined Numancia and played one season and played 21 games and scored 1 goal, before leaving in 2005. His career ended with Sabadell, as he joined them in 2005 and stayed for one year, but retired at the end of 2006.

Coaching career
In 2016, he joined Spain as an assistant of Julen Lopetegui. In 2018, he left the team with Lopetegui, and joined him in Real Madrid as an assistant. In 2019, he was appointed as the assistant coach of Sevilla. And in 2022, he joined Wolverhampton Wanderers as Julen Lopetegui's assistant.

References

1973 births
Living people
Footballers from Barcelona
Spanish footballers
La Liga players
Segunda División players
Segunda División B players
FC Barcelona Atlètic players
Gimnàstic de Tarragona footballers
Rayo Vallecano players
CD Numancia players
CE Sabadell FC footballers
Association football midfielders